The Double Mountain Fork Brazos River is an ephemeral, sandy-braided stream about  long, heading on the Llano Estacado of West Texas about  southeast of Tahoka, Texas, flowing east-northeast across the western Rolling Plains to join the Salt Fork, forming the Brazos River about  west-northwest of Haskell, Texas.

Geography
The stream generally runs eastward across southern Garza County, where it is fed by springs, providing a minimal base flow that is intermittently punctuated by rainfall and associated runoff. Double Mountains form part of the high ground dividing the watersheds of the Salt Fork to the north and the Double Mountain Fork to the south. To the east of Double Mountains, the Double Mountain Fork flows into western Haskell County before turning north and back westward into eastern Stonewall County, where it merges with the Salt Fork to form the Brazos River (proper), northeast of Aspermont, Texas.

Proper name
According to a 1964 decision by the United States Board on Geographical Names, this tributary of the Brazos is properly called the "Double Mountain Fork Brazos River", and should not be called the "Double Mountain Fork of the Brazos River" nor the "Double Mountain Fork of Brazos River". This stream is often mistakenly referred to as the "South Fork of the Double Mountain Fork of the Brazos River."  Perhaps this is an attempt to distinguish this stream from the North Fork Double Mountain Fork Brazos River,  a tributary of the Double Mountain Fork.  The stream described here, however, is the main stem of the Double Mountain Fork Brazos River and, therefore, it is not a tributary of the Double Mountain Fork, rather it is a tributary of the Brazos River.

See also

Blanco Canyon
Brazos Wind Farm
Caprock Escarpment
Colorado River
Double Mountains
Duffy's Peak
Farm to Market Road 400
Farm to Market Road 669
List of rivers of Texas
Mushaway Peak
North Fork Double Mountain Fork Brazos River
Prairie Dog Town Fork Red River
Salt Fork Brazos River
Yellow House Canyon
White River (Texas)

References

External links

Handbook of Texas: Double Mountain Fork

Brazos River
Rivers of Texas
Rivers of Lynn County, Texas
Rivers of Garza County, Texas
Rivers of Kent County, Texas
Rivers of Fisher County, Texas
Rivers of Haskell County, Texas
Rivers of Stonewall County, Texas